Cemil Conk (1873 in Üsküdar – 1963 in Istanbul) was a decorated officer of the Ottoman Army and a general of the Turkish Army. He received as surname the name of Conk Bayırı, where he successfully fought at the Battle of Chunuk Bair (Conk Bayırı in Turkish) during World War I.

Works
 Cemil Conk, Hatıraları: Balkan Harbi 1912–1913. [Çanakkale Seferi 1915], Türkiye Yayınevi, 1947.
 Cemil Conk, Çanakkale Conkbayırı Savaşları, Erkânıharbiyei Umumiye Basımevi, 1959.

Medals and decorations
Order of the Medjidie 3rd Class
Silver Medal of Liyakat
Gallipoli Star (Ottoman Empire)
Silver Medal of Imtiyaz
Medal of Independence with Red Ribbon

See also
List of high-ranking commanders of the Turkish War of Independence

Sources

1873 births
1963 deaths
People from Üsküdar
Ottoman Military Academy alumni
Ottoman Army officers
Ottoman military personnel of the Balkan Wars
Ottoman military personnel of World War I
Turkish military personnel of the Greco-Turkish War (1919–1922)
Turkish Army generals
Recipients of the Order of the Medjidie, 3rd class
Recipients of the Liakat Medal
Recipients of the Imtiyaz Medal
Recipients of the Medal of Independence with Red Ribbon (Turkey)